Jonathan Beck was an American film producer in the 1950s and 1960s. He played an important role in the making of King Kong vs. Godzilla and was also involved in the merger of Universal Pictures and International Pictures.

After the success of the original King Kong film, special effects artist Willis H. O’Brien wanted to make a film where King Kong fights a monster created by Dr. Frankenstein. In the early 1960s, O’Brien handed his idea to Beck for him to produce it. However, without O’Brien's permission, he went to a Japanese studio called Toho to make it. They changed it to King Kong vs. Godzilla, and it went on to be a big hit. O’Brien died a few months before King Kong vs. Godzilla was released in the U.S., but he was not pleased for what Beck did. He tired to sue Beck, but he didn't have enough money for the legal fees. One of the directors of the original King Kong Merian C. Cooper also tried to sue him, but it didn't get resolved until after he died. To make up for O’Brien's Frankenstein idea, Toho made Frankenstein Conquers the World in 1965, and later, The War of the Gargantuas in 1966.

Career 
Beck spent his career as a Film producer. Producing such films as One Touch of Venus, Harvey, Fury at Showdown, and the American version of King Kong vs. Godzilla.

Late life

The last film Beck produced was The Private Navy of Sgt. O'Farrell. Afterwards, he worked on lesser known projects, and he later died on July 18, 1993, at the age of 83.

References

1909 births
1993 deaths
Film producers from California
People from Pomona, California